Jurica Vučko (born 8 October 1976) is a Croatian former professional footballer who currently serves as an assistant manager of Croatian club Hajduk Split.

Club career
Vučko started his professional career with hometown's Hajduk Split, playing five seasons as an important first-team element. Subsequently, he moved to Spain, joining Deportivo Alavés after the Basque side's European exploits. Rarely used, he did net twice for the club, on 8 April 2001, in a 4–2 home triumph over Real Valladolid.

Staying in the country, Vučko spent a further four seasons playing in its second level, for UD Salamanca and Polideportivo Ejido (returning to Alavés in between), before returning to Hajduk in 2006. His return was short-lived however, as he transferred to Chinese League's Tianjin Teda F.C.

International career
Vučko made his debut for the Croatia national football team in a 2000 UEFA European Football Championship qualifying match on 10 October 1998, against Malta. He received a further 3 caps, his final international was a June 2001 World Cup qualification match against San Marino.

Personal life
He is an older brother of former Croatia international player Luka Vučko.

Honours

Player

Club
Hajduk Split
Croatian Cup: 1999–2000

References

External links
 
National team data 

1976 births
Living people
Footballers from Split, Croatia
Association football forwards
Croatian footballers
Croatia international footballers
HNK Hajduk Split players
Deportivo Alavés players
UD Salamanca players
Polideportivo Ejido footballers
Tianjin Jinmen Tiger F.C. players
Croatian Football League players
La Liga players
Segunda División players
Chinese Super League players
Croatian expatriate footballers
Croatian expatriate sportspeople in Spain
Expatriate footballers in Spain
Croatian expatriate sportspeople in China
Expatriate footballers in China
HNK Hajduk Split non-playing staff
PAOK FC non-playing staff
Croatian expatriate sportspeople in Greece